Tannery Falls is a waterfall on Tannery Creek located near the city of Munising, Michigan. The Falls are also sometimes called the Rudy M. Olson Memorial Falls. The grave site of Rudolf Olsen can be seen on the path leading to the falls alongside a set of stairs. Tannery Creek flows behind a small residential area before reaching The falls which drop  into an impressive sandstone canyon. There is a cave behind the falls. The level of water coming over the falls can vary greatly depending on snow melt or rainfall. Tannery Falls is one of the less-advertised and less-maintained falls in the area. For a number of years, the falls were under private ownership. The land around the area was purchased by the Michigan Nature Association which created a public nature preserve that includes the nearby Memorial Falls.

References
Great Lakes Waterfalls

Waterfalls of Michigan
Protected areas of Alger County, Michigan
Landforms of Alger County, Michigan
Articles containing video clips